The Tubular Exchanger Manufacturers Association (also known as TEMA) is an association of fabricators of shell and tube type heat exchangers. TEMA has established and maintains a set of construction standards for heat exchangers, known as the TEMA Standard.  TEMA also produces software for evaluation of flow-induced vibration and of flexible shell elements (expansion joints). TEMA was founded in 1939, and is based in Tarrytown, New York.  The association meets regularly to revise and update the standards, respond to inquiries, and discuss topics related to the industry.

The TEMA Standard 
The current edition of the TEMA Standard is the Tenth Edition, published in 2019.  Worldwide, the TEMA Standard is used as the construction standard for most shell and tube heat exchangers.  The standard is composed of ten sections:

 Nomenclature (see below)
 Fabrication Tolerances
 General Fabrication and Performance Information
 Installation, Operation, and Maintenance
 Mechanical Standards
 Flow Induced Vibration
 Thermal Relations
 Physical Properties of Fluids
 General Information
 Recommended Good Practice

TEMA Classifications of Heat Exchangers 
TEMA's standard recognizes three separate classifications of exchangers.  Each class has different mechanical construction requirements, based on the expected service.  Those classes are:

 Class R - for refinery and petroleum service
 Class C - for general commercial service
 Class B - for chemical process service

In general, Class C is the least restrictive class, and Class R is the most stringent, insuring more robust designs for longer life in harsher service conditions.

TEMA Exchanger Nomenclature 
Because heat exchangers can be configured many different ways, TEMA has standardized the nomenclature of exchanger types.  A letter designation is used for the front head type, shell type, and rear head type of an exchanger.  For example, a fixed tubesheet exchanger with bolted removable bonnets is designated as a 'BEM' type.  A kettle type reboiler with a removable U-tube bundle is a 'BKU' type.  Many different letter combinations are possible.

Member Companies of TEMA 
The member companies of TEMA must demonstrate high quality exchanger fabrication standards, and possess in-house engineering capability for mechanical and thermal design of shell and tube type heat exchangers.  Companies may fabricate other equipment in addition to heat exchangers.  The current member companies of TEMA (in alphabetical order) are:

 Brask, Inc.
 Cust-O-Fab, Inc.
 Dunn Heat Exchangers, Inc.
 Energy Exchanger Corp.
 Fabsco Shell and Tube
 Graham Corporation
 Heat Transfer Equipment Company
 Hughes-Anderson Heat Exchangers, Inc.
 Kennedy Tank and Manufacturing Co.
 Krueger Engineering & Mfg.
 Joseph Oat Corp.
 Ohmstede, Inc
 Perry Products
 R.A.S. Process Equipment
 Southern Heat Exchanger
 Struthers-Wells
 Ward Vessel and Exchanger

References

External links
 Official website

Heat exchangers
American engineering organizations
Manufacturing
Fabrication (metal)